Nuristani may refer to:
 Nuristani people
 Nuristani languages
 Nuristan

Language and nationality disambiguation pages